Grant Kekana (born 31 October 1992) is a South African soccer player who plays as a defender for Mamelodi Sundowns in the Premier Soccer League.

References

1992 births
Living people
People from Polokwane
Northern Sotho people
South African soccer players
Association football defenders
SuperSport United F.C. players
University of Pretoria F.C. players
Mamelodi Sundowns F.C. players
Soccer players from Limpopo